Glendale Junior/Senior High School is a public high school located near the village of Flinton, Pennsylvania.  The high school serves students from most of northern Cambria County, Pennsylvania, as well as Beccaria Township in Clearfield County. The school's mascot is the Viking.  The school is part of the Glendale School District (Pennsylvania).

References

Schools in Cambria County, Pennsylvania
Public high schools in Pennsylvania